Manuel A. Roxas High School is a secondary (high) school located in Paco, Manila. It is one of the six schools in Manila to provide the Special Science course for selected students.

The first building of Roxas High School was situated in Quezon Boulevard near Feati University. It was established in 1948 and is the first high school to be named after a former president, Manuel Acuna Roxas.

Special Science 
The establishment of the Special Science curriculum was spearheaded by the Department of Science and Technology- Science Education Institute in the 1980s.  For the moment, support form DOST has been withdrawn and Special Science classes are maintained by the Division of City Schools in the implementing schools namely Manuel A. Roxas High School, Ramon Magsaysay High School, Victorino Mapa High School, Cayetano Arellano High School and Manuel Araullo High School, with the exception of Manila Science High School which is a recognized science high school.

To be eligible for the Special Science sections, applicants must have final elementary grades no lower than 85 in Science, Math and English and 83 in other subjects. They are subjected to examination which includes knowledge of Sciences and use of Abstract Reasoning.

They are provided with elective subjects to fulfill the aim of the program; that is to give the students good grounding in Science, as well as in other subject areas.

There are three Special Science sections in Roxas per year level.

The student body is headed by the Supreme Student Government with officers elected yearly.

Facilities 
The School has seven buildings - the Main (L-Shaped), Vocational, Maceda, Hizon, Home Economics, SEDP and Administration buildings and three makeshift structures, two of which are temporary.

The Main, Vocational, Macaeda and Hizon buildings house the academic subject classes. The H.E. building is now used by the Science and Technology Department. The SEDP building is where H.E. classes are held. One of the two Guidance offices, the Museum, and EMIS office occupy the Administration, Marcos-type, building.

As of June 2006, the Main building, which is the most used, was declared "condemned" and unfit for use.  This was explained by the impact of the 1990 earthquake that hit Manila. After the declaration, the school was forced to squeeze schedules and rooms. This called for 13 makeshift rooms.

On February 22, 2008, President Gloria Macapagal-Arroyo led the groundbreaking for the PHP 220 million 4-storey building to replace the old structure. Also present in the event were Manila Mayor Alfredo S. Lim, Manila 6th District Rep. Benny Abante and 5th District Rep. Amado Bagatsing and Education Secretary Jesli Lapus. 

The new building is now in use.

Martsa Roxas (Roxas March)
Music and Lyrics by: 
Filipino translation by: 

Sama-sama tayong tumulong;
Itaguyod paaralang mahal;
Igalang siyang batis ng dunong;
"Paaralan nating Roxas Highschool;"
Batiin natin siya ng "Mabuhay";
Umawit nang taimtim at dingal;
Ipagbunyi ka, Roxas Highschool,
Alma Mater naming hirang."
"CHORUS:"Roxas Highschool, ang aming hangadDemokrasya magpakailanman;Ipagpatuloy ang kadakilaan mo.Gumawa nang tapat at nang buong puso.Aming Roxas, kami'y nagagalak,Para sa iyo'y pag-ibig na wagas;Maglilingkod tayo sa Inang BayanIpanalangin sa Maykapal."

Notes
 Department Of Education School Information- https://web.archive.org/web/20110716155351/http://www.deped.gov.ph/public/public.asp?sec=&action=edit&iID=458&type=Public
 Office of the Presidential Assistant for Education- 
 Science Education Institute- https://web.archive.org/web/20090206225533/http://www.sei.dost.gov.ph/simula.html
 Sinfuego, Roy: Manila Bulletin- http://www.mb.com.ph/node/86214
 PGMA breaks ground for construction of P220-M Roxas High School building in Paco: Gov. Ph News- http://www.gov.ph/news/default.asp?i=20176

Educational institutions established in 1948
High schools in Manila
Education in Paco, Manila
1948 establishments in the Philippines
Public schools in Metro Manila